Grupo Alexander Bain (Alexander Bain Group) is a set of schools in Mexico City. Named after Scottish educator Alexander Bain, the group offers kindergarten, elementary school, junior high and high school.

References 

Schools in Mexico City